West Chester Township is one of the thirteen townships of Butler County, Ohio, United States, located in the southeastern corner of the county. It is the most populous township in Ohio, with a population of 65,242 at the 2020 census. Exits 19, 21 and 22 off Interstate 75 serve West Chester.

History

The thirteenth and last in order of creation, it was erected from Liberty Township by the Butler County Commissioners on June 2, 1823, upon petitions from residents of the township. No boundaries were given in the resolution passed by the commissioners, but it originally contained 35 square miles (91 km), just short of a full survey township. The new township was given the name "Union." Because Union Township was familiarly known as West Chester, plus the abundance of other townships in Ohio called Union, the name was changed to West Chester Township effective June 28, 2000, after being ratified by the township's voters at the March 9 primary election. Many census and government records, including the 2000 census, refer to Union Township. Today, it is the only West Chester Township statewide.

Climate

Geography
Located in the southeastern corner of the county, it borders the following townships and cities:
Liberty Township - north
Mason - east
Deerfield Township, Warren County - east
Sharonville - southeast
Springdale - southwest
Fairfield - west
Fairfield Township - northwest

The southeastern corner of the township has been annexed by the city of Sharonville and a small portion in the west has been annexed by Fairfield.

The unincorporated communities of Maud, Port Union, Pisgah, and Tylersville are located in central, western, southwestern, and western West Chester Township respectively.

Economy

Top employers
According to West Chester's 2020 Comprehensive Annual Financial Report, the top employers in the township are:

Household Income

Government
The township is governed by a three-member board of trustees, Mark Welch, Lee Wong, and Ann Becker, who are elected in November of odd-numbered years to a four-year term beginning on the following January 1. Two are elected in the year after the presidential election and one is elected in the year before it. There is also an elected township fiscal officer, who serves a four-year term beginning on April 1 of the year after the election, which is held in November of the year before the presidential election.  Vacancies in the fiscal officership or on the board of trustees are filled by the remaining trustees.  Historically, West Chester Township has leaned heavily toward the Republican Party but in recent years that advantage has narrowed. Barack Obama only won 35.2% of the vote against John McCain's 63.5% in 2008, but in 2020 Joe Biden claimed 44% against Donald Trump's 54.5%. West Chester Township is entirely in Ohio’s 8th congressional district.

Three times voters have rejected the incorporation of the township as a city.  On February 2, 1988, the vote was 4,097 to 3,956 against incorporation; 5,816 to 4,972 against on August 8, 1989, and 5,054 to 4,679 against on August 3, 1993.

Public services

Formed in 1967, the township police department employs approximately 100 individuals. Led by Police Chief Joel Herzog, it is organized into three distinct bureaus: the Patrol Bureau, the Support Bureau, and the Administration Bureau.

The township was home to the Voice of America's Bethany Relay Station, a facility covering 625 acres (2.5 km) in the northeast corner of the township that broadcast American propaganda overseas from 1943 to 1994. The property owned by the Voice of America Station has now been converted into Voice of America MetroPark. This park consists of a 1.42-mile walking trail around a lake.  The Miami University Voice of America Learning Center was opened in 2009.  The township is home to several parks in addition to Voice of America MetroPark, including Keehner Park.  The township is also home to the Islamic Center of Greater Cincinnati, which is one of the largest mosques in the area.

In 2006 ground was broken for The Square at Union Centre which serves as the town square for West Chester hosting events surrounded by class A office space and restaurants. The West Chester library is part of the square and a bell-tower constructed by the famous and historic Verdin Bell Company of Cincinnati serves as the centerpiece to the square.

Some of the township is in the West Chester post office (45069) and the southeastern corner is served by the Sharonville office (45241). Fairfield (45014) and Hamilton (45011 or 45015) also serve the township.

Education
Most of the township is in the Lakota Local School District, but portions are also in the Princeton City School District and a tiny part on the eastern border is in the Mason City School District.  The largest single school building in the township is the Lakota West High School Main Campus. The Lakota West High School Main Campus has about 2,000 students and 145 staff members.  The principal at Lakota West High School is Ben Brown. Lakota West is classified by OHSAA as a Division 1 school.  Lakota West High School is home to the 2007 Ohio State Baseball Champions, led by Coach Bill Dreisbach.

Notable people
John A. Boehner, 61st Speaker of the United States House of Representatives
Fr. Anthony Cekada, traditional Catholic priest
Bill Coley, former Ohio Senator
John Conner, former fullback for the New York Giants
Bp. Daniel Dolan, traditional Catholic bishop
Rich Franklin, mixed martial arts fighter
Andre Frazier, former linebacker for the Pittsburgh Steelers and Cincinnati Bengals.
Ken Griffey Sr., former baseball player for the Cincinnati Reds
Ken Griffey Jr., Hall of Fame baseball player for the Seattle Mariners and the Cincinnati Reds
Jorge Gurgel, mixed martial arts fighter
Jordan Hicks, linebacker for the Philadelphia Eagles
Ryan Kelly, center for the Indianapolis Colts
Vivek Ramaswamy, New York Times bestselling author
E.W. Scripps, newspaper publisher (Scripps-McRae League, Scripps-Howard), April–November each year

References

Further reading
Bert S. Barlow, W.H. Todhunter, Stephen D. Cone, Joseph J. Pater, and Frederick Schneider, eds. Centennial History of Butler County, Ohio. Hamilton, Ohio: B.F. Bowen, 1905.
Jim Blount. The 1900s: 100 Years In the History of Butler County, Ohio. Hamilton, Ohio: Past Present Press, 2000.
Butler County Engineer's Office. Butler County Official Transportation Map, 2003. Fairfield Township, Butler County, Ohio: The Office, 2003.
A History and Biographical Cyclopaedia of Butler County, Ohio with Illustrations and Sketches of Its Representative Men and Pioneers. Cincinnati, Ohio: Western Biographical Publishing Company, 1882. 
Ohio. Secretary of State. The Ohio municipal and township roster, 2002-2003. Columbus, Ohio: The Secretary, 2003.
Virginia I. Shewalter. A History of Union Township, Butler County, Ohio. [West Chester, Ohio?]: The Author, 1979.

External links

County website

Townships in Butler County, Ohio
Townships in Ohio
1823 establishments in Ohio
Populated places established in 1823